Hoseynabad (also Romanized as Ḩoseynābād; also known as Ḩoseynābād-e Kolyā’ī and Husainābād) is a village in Kolyai Rural District, in the Central District of Asadabad County, Hamadan Province, Iran. At the 2006 census, its population was 223, in 46 families.

References 

Populated places in Asadabad County